Million Dollar Baby is a 1934 American comedy film directed by Joseph Santley and starring Arline Judge, Ray Walker and Jimmy Fay.

Synopsis
Hoping to cash in on the Shirley Temple craze, a couple of vaudeville actors dress their son up as a girl and enter him into a competition to find a new child star. After winning the contest they travel to Hollywood, but their son escapes from the train before being kidnapped by a gang who plan to extort a ransom from the studio.

Cast
 Arline Judge as Grace Sweeney 
 Ray Walker as Terry Sweeney 
 Jimmy Fay as Pat Sweeney 
 George E. Stone as Joe Lewis 
 Willard Robertson as Doctor 
 Ralf Harolde as Mac 
 Jeanette Loff as Rita Ray 
 Arthur Stone as Jim 
 Harry Holman as J.D. Pemberton 
 Paul Porcasi as Marvelo No. 1 
 Eddie Kane as Bill Dovan 
 Claudia Coleman as Studio Actress 
 Marc Lawrence as Gangster 
 Wilbur Mack as Freeman 
 Lee Shumway as Tony 
 Edward Peil Sr. as Louie 
 Louise Beavers as Black Mother 
 Velma Connor as Sister Act

References

Bibliography
 Jean-Louis Ginibre. Ladies Or Gentlemen: A Pictorial History of Male Cross-dressing in the Movies. Filipacchi Publishing, 2005.

External links
 

1934 films
American comedy films
Films directed by Joseph Santley
Monogram Pictures films
American black-and-white films
1934 comedy films
Films about filmmaking
1930s English-language films
1930s American films